Bahiel ben Moses was a Jewish physician of the thirteenth century. He was court physician to King James I of Aragon, and in that capacity was present at the conquest of Majorca, where he rendered valuable service as interpreter between the Arabic-speaking Majorcan Moors and the conqueror, who understood only the Limousin dialect. In the dispute concerning Maimonides' writings, Bahiel made himself by his zeal the leading representative of the philosopher's defenders. In 1232 he wrote the appeal to the Jewish congregations of Aragon to recognize the excommunication pronounced upon Solomon ben Abraham of Montpellier and his associates.
Bahiel was the brother of Solomon Bahiel ben Moses.

Sources
Gottheil, Richard and Mayer Kayserling. "Bahiel". Jewish Encyclopedia. Funk and Wagnalls, 1901–1906; citing:
Meyer Kayserling, Gesch. der Juden in Spanien und Portugal, i. 160, 218;
Iggerot ha-Rambam, ed. Prag, pp. 34a, 35b;
Brüll, Jahrbücher, iv. 22;
Heinrich Graetz, Gesch. der Juden, vii. 33, 57;
Jacobs, Sources, pp. 285, 286.

Medieval Jewish physicians of Spain
13th-century people from the Kingdom of Aragon
Interpreters
Year of death unknown
13th-century Catalan Jews
Year of birth unknown